Azarshahr (also Romanized as Āz̄arshahr, Âzaršahr, Azərşəhr, or Āz̄ar Shahr; also known as Tufarqan (Persian: توفارقان), also Romanized as Dehkhvāreqān)  is a city in Howmeh District of Azarshahr County, East Azerbaijan province, Iran, and serves as capital of the county. At the 2006 census, its population was 36,475 in 9,854 households. The following census in 2011 counted 39,918 people in 11,827 households. The latest census in 2016 showed a population of 44,887 people in 14,343 households, all Azerbaijanis

References

External links
"آذرشهر" (Iranica Encyclopedia)

Azarshahr County

Cities in East Azerbaijan Province

Populated places in East Azerbaijan Province

Populated places in Azarshahr County